Peter Shakespear (born 27 September 1946) is an Australian rower. He competed at the 1972 Summer Olympics and the 1976 Summer Olympics. Shakespear is married to Wilma Shakespear, a former Australia netball international, netball coach and sports administrator.

References

1946 births
Living people
Australian male rowers
Olympic rowers of Australia
Rowers at the 1972 Summer Olympics
Rowers at the 1976 Summer Olympics
Rowers from Perth, Western Australia